Ptasie mleczko or Bird's milk is a Central European confectionery originating in Poland. It is a small, chocolate-covered bar with a soft marshmallow-like interior.

Bird's milk is one of the most recognized chocolate confectioneries in Poland, having exclusive rights for the name Ptasie mleczko. Other confectionery producers also make similar candies named differently (e.g., Alpejskie mleczko, "Alpine milk"). Nonetheless, Ptasie mleczko is often used to refer to similar candies with vanilla, cream, lemon or chocolate flavour.

In Russia, ptichye moloko (птичье молоко) is both a popular candy and a famous soufflé cake. The brand was introduced in the 1960s during the Soviet era, and continues to be used by companies operating the factories which produced these candies and cakes since that time. The confectionery is also produced in other post-Soviet states.

Origin of the name
The concept of avian milk (ornithon gala) stretches back to ancient Greece. Aristophanes uses "the milk of the birds" in the plays The Birds and The Wasps as a proverbial rarity. The expression is also found in Strabo's Geographica where the island of Samos is described as a blest country, to which those who praise it do not hesitate to apply the proverb that "it produces even bird's milk" (φέρει καί ὀρνίθων γάλα). A similar expression lac gallinaceum (Latin for "chicken's milk") was also later used by Petronius (38.1) and Pliny the Elder (Plin. Nat. pr. 24) as a term for something of great rarity. The idiom later became common in many languages and appeared in Slavic folk tales. In one such tale, the beautiful princess tests the ardor and resourcefulness of her suitor by sending him out into the wilderness to find and bring back the one fantastical luxury she does not have: bird's milk. In the fairy tale Little Hare by Aleksey Remizov (who wrote many imitations of traditional Slavic folk tales), the magic bird Gagana produces milk.

Whether any of these authors were aware of crop milk from some species of birds is unknown.

History and variations

According to the company's official history, Wedel's inspiration for the name of the confectionery came from his voyages to France, when he asked himself: "What could bring greater happiness to a man who already has everything?" Then he thought: "Maybe only bird milk."

In Russia, ptichye moloko was originally a type of confectionery introduced in 1967 in Vladivostok and in 1968 by the Rot Front factory in Moscow. It became a hit, and mass production was started in 1975 by the Krasny Oktyabr confectionery factory in Moscow.

In Estonia, linnupiim (also "bird's milk" in Estonian) is the brand name of a similar candy made by the Kalev candy factory. This candy also uses agar-agar instead of gelatin as a thickening agent and comes in three flavors: chocolate, vanilla, and lemon. In 2021, a special edition with grapefruit flavor was produced.

In Moldova, lapte de pasăre (also "bird's milk" in Romanian) is the brand name of a similar candy made by the Bucuria candy factory. Despite the name, the candy is not to be confused with the Romanian traditional dessert lapte de pasăre.

Bird's milk cake 

In 1978, the popular candy was transformed into a cake by Vladimir Guralnik in Moscow's Praga Restaurant. This was a light sponge cake filled with an airy soufflé and topped with chocolate glaze. A distinct feature of the Russian recipe is the usage of agar-agar instead of gelatin as a thickening agent which withstands the high temperature needed to melt down sugar into a syrup. Initially, the restaurant produced trial batches of 20-30 cakes, but after six months the daily output was increased to 500 cakes. The recipe was quickly copied by other restaurants in Moscow, such as Moskva, Budapesht, and Ukraina. In the 1980s, a special factory for Bird's milk cakes was built in the Novye Cheryomushky district in the south of Moscow. Both the cake and the candy versions of the bird's milk are widely available to this date in supermarkets and specialty stores all over Russia.

Trade marks

Lapte de pasăre, Ptasie Mleczko, Ptiche moloko, and Vogelmilch are registered trademarks in the EU.

In Russia, Птичье молоко is a registered trademark of Rot Front, a member of United Confectioners. Other companies have been sued for using the name, even if they had used it in the Soviet Union.

See also
 List of chocolate-covered foods
 List of Polish desserts
 List of Russian desserts

References

External links
 E. Wedel chocolates
 ООО «Птичье молоко». Moscow "Ptichye moloko" cake factory (in Russian)

Chocolate-covered foods
Marshmallows
Brand name chocolate
Polish desserts
Belarusian desserts
Latvian desserts
Russian desserts
Ukrainian desserts
Soviet cuisine
Polish brands
Polish confectionery
Soviet brands
Russian brands
Ukrainian brands